Jacksons is a settlement in British Columbia. According to a Canadian government resource, Jacksons is a scattered settlement of fifty or fewer individuals.

References 

Settlements in British Columbia